Hans Stacey (born 9 March 1958, Best, Netherlands) is a Dutch rally car driver. He participated in various national championships, where he became the champion of his country in 1991 and 1992, driving a Mitsubishi Galant VR 4. He also was victorious driving a Subaru Impreza in 1997 and 2001.

Career
He has competed in the Dakar Rally since 2004 in the truck category, initially as co-driver for his uncle Jan de Rooy and since 2006 as driver for the Exact-MAN team. After finishing second in the 2006 Dakar Rally, Stacey went on to win the 2007 Dakar Rally, winning five stages and coming in with more than a three-hour lead over the runner-up Ilgizar Mardeev, repeating the race in 2008 at the Central Europe Rally (the official replacement race, technically part of the event lineage).

His best and only student Greg Jenkins, was currently refining his skills in the Derbyshire dales before his debut in the coming season, accompanied by his pro co-driver Jon White. Unfortunately due to injury Greg Jenkins has been unable to pass medical examination allowing him to compete, Jon White has spoken out to the press in late 2015 stating that "Greg will be returning to the rally scene, Hans and myself will be supporting him every step of the way".

Career results

Complete WRC results

Dakar Rally results

NOTE:  Because of the 2007 killing of French tourists in Mauritania, the Dakar Rally in 2008 was moved to Europe and became the 2008 Central Europe Rally for that year only.  Since the Amaury Sport Organisation simply gave all Dakar entries to the new race it is part of the lineage of Dakar.

External links
 "MAN with a mission 2" website (participation of MAN in the 2008 Dakar Rally)
  (pre-prologue of the 2008 Rally Dakar)

1958 births
Living people
Dutch rally drivers
Dakar Rally drivers
Dakar Rally winning drivers
People from Best, Netherlands
Rally raid truck drivers
Sportspeople from North Brabant